Adesanya Doyinsola, better known as D'Tunes, is a multi award-winning music producer, CEO Difference Entertainment, Visionary, arts and fashion enthusiast. He was affiliated with Made Men Music Group and currently has a record label called Difference Entertainment. He is known for producing for Iyanya and Sean Tizzle and the hit singles "Kukere" and "Sho Lee" by them.  He has won several awards including The Headies 2013 for Producer of the Year. He is popularly known for producing songs like Kukere, Ur Waist, Sexy Mama ft Wizkid, Jombolo with Flavour and many more for Iyanya off his sophomore album "Desire", Sho Lee, Mama Eh, Perfect Gentleman, Loke Loke and many more for Sean Tizzle off his debut album The Journey

D'Tunes has also produced numerous other artists like Mr Eazi, Yemi Alade, Reminisce, 9ice, Mayorkun, Teni and CDQ. He was nominated in the Music Producer of the Year category at the Nigeria Entertainment Awards 2014.

Early life and career
Like many successful musicians, Doyinsola started in music from the church by learning how to play the drums and keyboard until he was good enough to play for the church choir. Years later, his musical prowess has been channeled into beat making and song writing despite early oppositions from parents.

He studied in Olabisi Onabanjo University until he dropped out of school in 2009. He started developing interest in production of songs after he wrote his UTME and was awaiting Admission and he became really more interested in producing than school so he had to drop out.

Production discography

Singles
Official single by "D'Tunes"

Singles produced

Albums produced

Difference Entertainment
Difference Entertainment was founded by ''Tunes in 2013.

Artists
Artists signed to Difference Entertainment

Awards

References 

Living people
Nigerian hip hop record producers
Nigerian songwriters
People from Ibadan
Yoruba musicians
Yoruba-language writers
Place of birth missing (living people)
1990 births